An Additional Commissioner of Income Tax is a high-ranking senior income tax officer in several countries.

India 
Additional Director or additional Commissioner of Income Tax is a rank in the Indian Revenue Service (IRS). The officer holding this rank is above a Joint Commissioner or deputy commissioner of police and under a Commissioner of Income Tax.

Bangladesh
In Bangladesh, an Additional Commissioner of Income Taxes is a Grade-4 officer. Officer of this rank works as a range officer and supervises the Deputy Commissioner of Taxes.

Pakistan
In Pakistan, there is an Additional Commissioner of Income Tax in each range.

Italy
In Italy, the Additional Commissioner is a deputy to the Commissioner.

Sweden
In Sweden, the Additional Commissioner of Income Tax means the head of a taxation range.

See also 

 Civil Services of India
 All India Service
 Corruption in India

References 

Central Civil Services (India)
Income Tax Department of India
Revenue services
Ministry of Finance (India)